The 2013 Cork Intermediate Hurling Championship was the 104th staging of the Cork Intermediate Hurling Championship since its establishment by the Cork County Board in 1909. The draw for the opening round fixtures took place on 9 December 2012. The championship began on 1 June 2013 and ended on 3 November 2013.

On 3 November 2013, Kanturk won the championship following a 2-22 to 1-12 defeat of Éire Óg in the final at Páirc Uí Chaoimh. This was their first ever championship title.

Michel Walsh and Kevin Hallissey were the championship's joint top scorers.

Team changes

To Championship

Promoted from the Cork Junior A Hurling Championship
 Kildorrery

Relegated from the Cork Premier Intermediate Hurling Championship
 Aghabullogue

From Championship

Promoted to the Cork Premier Intermediate Hurling Championship
 Kilworth

Relegated to the City Junior A Hurling Championship
 Blackrock

Results

First round

Second round

Third round

Relegation playoff

Fourth round

 Aghada and Éire Óg received byes in this round.

Quarter-finals

Semi-finals

Final

Championship statistics

Top scorers

Overall

In a single game

References

Cork Intermediate Hurling Championship
Cork Intermediate Hurling Championship